Ryan Whitney (born 1983) is an American former professional ice hockey player.

Ryan Whitney may also refer to:

 Ryan Newman (actress) (born 1998) American actress, singer, and model